Priyutovo (Priyut) is an urban locality (a work settlement) in Belebeyevsky District of the Republic of Bashkortostan, Russia. As of the 2010 Census, its population was 20,891.

Administrative and municipal status
Within the framework of administrative divisions, the work settlement of Priyutovo is incorporated within Belebeyevsky District as Priyutovsky Settlement Council. As a municipal division, Priyutovsky Settlement Council is incorporated within Belebeyevsky Municipal District as Priyutovsky Urban Settlement.

References

Notes

Sources

Urban-type settlements in Bashkortostan
